The first season of The Lying Game, based on the book series of the same name by Sara Shepard. The series premiered on August 15, 2011 and concluded on March 5, 2012 on ABC Family. It follows long-lost twins Emma Becker and Sutton Mercer. Separated under mysterious circumstances, Sutton was adopted by the wealthy Mercer family in Phoenix, while Emma grew up in the foster system. When the twins reunite as teenagers, they keep it a secret. While Sutton goes in search of the truth, Emma takes over her life and discovers more secrets and lies than she could have imagined.

It premiered to 1.39 million viewers and the summer finale accumulated 1.28 million viewers. The Lying Game went on hiatus and returned with its winter premiere on January 5, 2012, and has hit its series high with 1.8 million viewers and has continued for three consecutive weeks.

Cast and characters

Main cast 
 Alexandra Chando as Emma Becker and Sutton Mercer
 Andy Buckley as Ted Mercer 
 Allie Gonino as Laurel Mercer
 Alice Greczyn as Madeline "Mads" Rybak
 Sharon Pierre-Louis as Nisha Randall 
 Kirsten Prout as Charlotte "Char" Chamberlin 
 Blair Redford as Ethan Whitehorse
 Helen Slater as Kristin Mercer

Recurring cast 
Adrian Pasdar as Alec Rybak
Tyler Christopher as Dan Whitehorse
Christian Alexander as Thayer Rybak
Randy Wayne as Justin Miller 
Charisma Carpenter as Annie "Rebecca" Sewell
Ben Elliott as Derek Rogers 
Adam Brooks as Baz
Misha Crosby as Ryan Harwell
Rick Malambri as Eduardo Diaz
Sydney Barrosse as Phyllis Chamberlin

Guest cast 
Stacy Edwards as Annie Hobbs
Gil Birmingham as Ben Whitehorse
Kenneth Miller as Travis Boyle
Dora Madison Burge as Lexi Samuels
Jennifer Griffin as Dr. Hughes
Yara Martinez as Theresa Lopez
Craig Nigh as Officer Harry
Katherine Willis as Nancy Rogers

Notes

Episodes

References

2011 American television seasons
2012 American television seasons